This is a list of notable buildings in St. John's, Newfoundland and Labrador, Canada.

Museums
Johnson Geo Centre
Railway Coastal Museum
The Rooms

Government Buildings
Colonial Building
Confederation Buildings
Government House
Supreme Court of Newfoundland and Labrador

Office Towers
351
Fortis Building

Schools
Bishops College (now defunct)
Gonzaga High School
Holy Heart of Mary High School
Memorial University of Newfoundland
Prince of Wales Collegiate
Saint Bonaventure's College

Religious buildings
Basilica of St. John the Baptist
Cathedral of St. John the Baptist
George Street United Church
St. John's Hindu Temple
St. Patrick's Church

Historical Buildings
Bank of British North America Building
Cabot Tower
Masonic Temple
Murray Premises

Other
Arts and Culture Centre
Avalon Mall
CFS St. John's
The Fluvarium
Hotel Newfoundland
Memorial Stadium
Mile One Centre
St. John's Convention Centre

See also

 Architecture of St. John's, Newfoundland and Labrador
 List of tallest buildings in St. John's, Newfoundland and Labrador

St. John's